The Association for Community Health Improvement (ACHI)] is a professional organization for community health, community benefit, healthy communities and public health, founded in 2002.  It is an affiliate of the American Hospital Association.

Mission and Focus Areas

The Association's mission is to convene and support leaders from the health care, public health, community and philanthropic sectors to help achieve shared community health goals, and work with members to strengthen community health through education, peer networking, and the dissemination of practical tools.

ACHI serves members' needs in a number of focus areas within community health, including:

 Access to care: primary and specialty care for underserved populations, insurance coverage and barriers to access, disparities in care due to language and cultural differences, transportation assistance, and more.
 Chronic disease prevention and management: community-based approaches to create the conditions for health and reverse the course of chronic disease.
 Community benefit: tools and methods to improve community benefit practices within hospitals and health systems.
 Collaborative strategies: effective partnerships based on healthy communities principles to achieve real advances in community health while strengthening the health system.
 Measurement and evaluation: logic models, indicators, and assessments to help establish goals, understand outcomes, and communicate progress.

The Association offers educational webinars, an annual conference, online career center, community health assessment tool, and professional networking opportunities.

History

The Association for Community Health Improvement was conceived in 2002 as a successor to three national community health initiatives: the Community Care Network Demonstration Program, ACT National Outcomes Network, and Coalition for Healthier Cities and Communities. These three programs had made contributions to community health since the mid-1990s, focusing on topics including health care delivery and preventive health systems, careful planning for and measurement of progress toward defined community health goals, and broad community engagement in resolving systemic challenges to community health and social well-being.

ACHI has over 700 members from 47 states, the District of Columbia, and Canada.

See also
 American Hospital Association

References

External links
 Association for Community Health Improvement homepage

Public health organizations
Organizations established in 2002
2002 establishments in the United States